Bambusa multiplex is a species  of bamboo native to China (provinces of Guangdong, Guangxi, Hainan, Hunan, Jiangxi, Sichuan, Yunnan), Nepal, Bhutan, Assam, Sri Lanka, Taiwan, and northern Indochina. It is also naturalized in Japan, Iraq, Madagascar, Mauritius, Seychelles, the Indian subcontinent, parts of South America, the West Indies, and the southeastern United States (Florida, Georgia, Alabama).

B. multiplex forms a medium-sized clump with slender culms (stems) and dense foliage. This bamboo is suitable for hedges and live fences since the stems and foliage form a dense growth that create an effective barrier. The height of the stems under ideal conditions is about 10 ft. Propagation is through rhizome offsets and rooted culm (stem) cuttings. Micro propagation too is feasible through axillary bud proliferation.

References

multiplex
Indomalayan realm flora
Flora of Indo-China
Flora of Southeast China
Flora of Bhutan
Flora of Nepal
Flora of Sri Lanka
Flora of Taiwan
Flora of South-Central China
Flora of Hainan
Flora of Assam (region)
Plants described in 1832